Robert Hearfield Stephenson  (3 June 1906 – 9 November 1942) was an English first-class cricketer and Royal Navy officer.

The son of William Hugh Stephenson and his wife, Ethel, he was born in June 1906 at Brough, Yorkshire. After leaving school, Stephenson opted to join the Royal Navy, being commissioned as an acting sub-lieutenant in September 1926, with promotion to sub-lieutenant following in May 1927. He made his debut in first-class cricket for the Royal Navy against the Royal Air Force at The Oval in 1927. He made two further first-class appearances for the navy in 1928, playing against the British Army cricket team and the Royal Air Force. He scored 122 runs in his three matches, including making 75 on debut. 

Stephenson was promoted to the rank of lieutenant commander in May 1937, before later serving in the Second World War. During the war he was promoted to the rank of commander in June 1941, in addition to receiving the Distinguished Service Order in August 1942 for his actions while commanding  during the Battle of Madagascar. Stephenson was killed aboard HMS Cromer when the ship hit a mine off the coast of the Egyptian port of Mersa Matruh on 9 November 1942. His body was never recovered. His brother, John, also played first-class cricket.

References

External links

1906 births
1942 deaths
People from Elloughton-cum-Brough
Royal Navy officers of World War II
English cricketers
Royal Navy cricketers
Companions of the Distinguished Service Order
Royal Navy personnel killed in World War II
Military personnel from Yorkshire